The Superstar is a style of a low-top athletic shoe which has been manufactured by the German multinational company Adidas since 1969. The low-top shoe was originally released as a low-top version of the Pro Model basketball shoe. The design is nicknamed the "clam-toe", "shell-toe", "shell shoes", "shell tops", and "sea shells" (along with Adicolor).

History
When the Superstar was introduced, it was the first low-top basketball shoe to feature an all-leather upper and rubber shell toe. With its rubber toe protection and non-marking sole, the shoe caught the attention of NCAA and NBA players, notably Kareem Abdul-Jabbar. Within the first years of production, the Superstar was reportedly worn by more than 75% of all NBA players. Over the course of the next few years, it advanced from the court to the streets and, consequently, into the public's consciousness. 

The Superstar has become part of popular youth fashion culture and is now worn as casual footwear, rather than for sports. Like Converse's Chuck Taylor All-Stars, the Superstar made a transition from the basketball court to the street, sported by hip-hop aficionados. In the early 1980s, 'b-boys' wore shoes with extra thick laces called "fat laces", often matching the color of the laces with the color of the stripes on their shoe. 

In 1983, the rap group Run-D.M.C. balked at traditional pop standard costuming, by choosing to wear regular street clothes on stage. The trio wore Superstars without any laces with the tongue of the shoe pushed out. "Adidas itself found out about this love story when the band held up the 3-Striped shoes during a concert in front of 40,000 fans – one of these concertgoers was an Adidas employee." The rap group continued to wear Superstars on their US concert tour, which in turn increased sales. Responding to an anti-sneaker rap song by Jerrald Deas called "Felon Sneakers", the trio released a song of their own called "My Adidas" in 1986. The song paid tribute to the Superstar shoe and attempted to flip the stereotype of the 'b-boy'. Adidas eventually signed an advertising deal with Run-D.M.C., which was the first endorsement deal between hip-hop artists and a major corporation. The brand subsequently released a Run-D.M.C. clothing line. The design of the shoe has had major changes throughout the years. The shoe has undergone many transformations since then with more creative designs being released each year.

The Superstar (now known officially as the "Superstar II", as the current production shape differs from the original) are now sold in Adidas Originals stores, with new colors and designs including themes such as NBA teams and major US cities.

35th Anniversary Series
In 2005, Adidas collaborated with pop icons from the world of music, fashion, and the arts to create the Adidas 35th Anniversary collection, which included 35 different models from five different series.

References

External links

Adidas
Products introduced in 1969
1970s fashion
1980s fashion
1990s fashion
2000s fashion
2010s fashion
2020s fashion